Ferenc Lengyel (born 9 September 1966) is a retired Hungarian football midfielder.

References

1966 births
Living people
Hungarian footballers
Dunaújváros FC players
Pécsi MFC players
Association football midfielders
Nemzeti Bajnokság I players
Hungarian football managers
Nemzeti Bajnokság I managers